The 2016 Hockenheimring GP2 Series round was a GP2 Series motor race held on 30 and 31 July 2016 at the Hockenheimring in Germany. It was the seventh round of the 2016 GP2 Series. The race weekend supported the 2016 German Grand Prix.

Background

René Binder replaced Sergio Canamasas at Carlin GP2 team ahead of this round. This would be the second team Binder has driven for this year after having substituted for Nobuharu Matsushita in Austria for ART Grand Prix.

Report

Qualifying
Sergey Sirotkin secured his third pole position of the year, marginally beating Pierre Gasly by sixteen-thousandths of a second, with Raffaele Marciello achieving third.

 Antonio Giovinazzi was excluded from qualifying due to not complying with undertray requirements.

Feature Race
Sirotkin took his second victory in succession from Luca Ghiotto and Raffaele Marciello

Sprint Race
Alex Lynn took his first victory of the season after starting from the front row. It was also the first victory of the season for the DAMS outfit. Sirotkin finished second after a storming drive from eighth and Arthur Pic achieved third .

Standings after the round

Drivers' Championship standings

Teams' Championship standings

 Note: Only the top five positions are included for both sets of standings.

See also 
 2016 German Grand Prix
 2016 Hockenheimring GP3 Series round

References

External links 
 Official website of GP2 Series

GP2
Hockenheimring
Hockenheimring